Stephen Dunifer (born 1951/1952) is an American radio engineer, author and anarchist socialist who founded Free Radio Berkeley in 1993 Berkeley, California. 

Free Radio Berkeley, an unlicensed micropower pirate radio station, was an expression of Dunifer's socialist anarchist principles, and was inspired by Black Liberation Radio in Springfield, Illinois and by Japanese micropower radio stations.  Free Radio Berkeley was involved in a protracted legal case with the Federal Communications Commission in the mid-1990s. At the time, it was illegal to broadcast on less than 100 watts.

Selected works 

 Seizing the Airwaves: A Free Radio Handbook, 1998,

References

Further reading 

 https://books.google.com/books?id=swv53KTLriAC&pg=PA288

External links
 www.FreeRadio.org

Year of birth missing (living people)
Living people
American anarchists
American radio company founders